Vetaforma is a genus of liverworts found only in Argentina and Chile, and contains a single species Vetaforma dusenii.  It is classified in order  Jungermanniales and is the only member of the family  Vetaformataceae within that order.  The genus and family names were originally published in 1960, but this publication was invalid under Article 36.1 of the ICBN.

Analysis of morphology and DNA sequences suggests that Vetaforma is the sister group of the Lepicoleaceae.

References

External links 
 

Jungermanniales
Jungermanniales genera
Monotypic bryophyte genera
Flora of Argentina
Flora of Chile